Scoparia sinensis is a moth in the family Crambidae. It was described by Patrice J.A. Leraut in 1986. It is found in the Chinese provinces of Zhejiang, Guizhou, Hubei, Shandong and Sichuan.

The length of the forewings is 7–8 mm. The forewings have a blackish-brown stripe basally. The antemedian line is white and the antemedian stigmata is filled with ochreous and edged with blackish brown. The postmedian and subterminal lines are white. The hindwings are white, suffused with pale brown towards the termen.

References

Moths described in 1986
Scorparia